Prakash Abitkar is a Shiv Sena politician from Kolhapur district, Maharashtra. He is current Member of (2014-2019, 2019+) Legislative Assembly from Radhanagari Vidhan Sabha constituency of Kolhapur, Maharashtra, India as a member of Shiv Sena.

Positions held
 2014: Elected to Maharashtra Legislative Assembly
2019: Elected to Maharashtra Legislative Assembly contained for second term

References

External links
 Shiv Sena Home Page

Living people
People from Kolhapur district
Maharashtra MLAs 2014–2019
Shiv Sena politicians
Marathi politicians
Year of birth missing (living people)